Go For Your Life  is a program set up by the Victorian Government to promote fitness and healthy eating. It is aimed at Victorians of all ages. Their advertisements have now become well known.

See also

Other physical fitness campaigns and programmes
 Life. Be in it.

References

External links
 http://www.healthinfonet.ecu.edu.au/key-resources/programs-projects?pid=675
 http://www.healthinfonet.ecu.edu.au/key-resources/programs-projects?pid=59
 http://www.theage.com.au/news/National/Go-for-your-life--make-healthy-living-the-norm/2004/11/10/1100021884484.html
 http://dro.deakin.edu.au/view/DU:30031021
 https://www.parliament.vic.gov.au/images/stories/committees/etc/112goforyourlife210709.pdf
 http://www.bendigoweekly.com.au/news/opposition-queries-kids-go-for-your-life-funding-future

2007 neologisms
Australian advertising slogans
Television shows set in Victoria (Australia)